In an internal combustion engine, the engine block is the structure which contains the cylinders and other components. In an early automotive engine, the engine block consisted of just the cylinder block, to which a separate crankcase was attached. Modern engine blocks typically have the crankcase integrated with the cylinder block as a single component. Engine blocks often also include elements such as coolant passages and oil galleries.

The term "cylinder block" is often used interchangeably with "engine block", although technically, the block of a modern engine (i.e. multiple cylinders integrated with another component) would be classified as a monobloc.



Construction 
The main structure of an engine typically consists of the cylinders, coolant passages, oil galleries, crankcase, and cylinder head(s). The first production engines of the 1880s to 1920s usually used separate components for each of these elements, which were bolted together during engine assembly. Modern engines, however, often combine many of these elements into a single component in order to reduce production costs.

The evolution from separate components to monobloc engine blocks has been a gradual progression since the early 20th century. The integration of elements has relied on the development of foundry and machining techniques. For example, a practical low-cost V8 engine was not feasible until Ford developed the techniques used to build its flathead V8 engine. Those techniques were then applied by other manufacturers to their engines.

Cylinder block 

A cylinder block is the structure which contains the cylinder, plus any cylinder sleeves and coolant passages. In the earliest decades of internal combustion engine development, cylinders were usually cast individually, so cylinder blocks were usually produced individually for each cylinder. Following that, engines began to combine two or three cylinders into a single cylinder block, with an engine combining several of these cylinder blocks combined.

In early engines with multiple cylinder bankssuch as V6, V8, or flat-6 engineseach bank was typically made of one or multiple separate cylinder blocks. Since the 1930s, mass production methods have developed to allow both banks of cylinders to be integrated into the same cylinder block.

Cylinder liners 
Wet liner cylinder blocks use cylinder walls that are entirely removable, which fit into the block by means of special gaskets. They are referred to as "wet liners" because their outer sides come in direct contact with the engine's coolant. In other words, the liner serves as the entire cylinder wall, rather than being merely a sleeve.

Advantages of wet liners are a lower mass, reduced space requirements, and coolant being heated faster from a cold start, which reduces start-up fuel consumption and provides heating for the car cabin sooner.

Dry liner cylinder blocks use either the block's material or a discrete liner inserted into the block to form the backbone of the cylinder wall. Additional sleeves are inserted within, which remain "dry" on their outside, surrounded by the block's material.

For either wet or dry liner designs, the liners (or sleeves) can be replaced, potentially allowing an engine overhaul or rebuild without replacing the block itself, although this is often not a practical repair option.

Coolant and oil passages

Crankcase 

The crankcase is the structure that houses the crankshaft. As with cylinder blocks, this is primarily an integrated component in modern engines.

Materials 
Engine blocks are normally cast from either cast iron or an aluminium alloy. Aluminium blocks are much lighter in weight and transfer heat more effectively to coolant, but iron blocks retain some advantages, such as durability and reduced thermal expansion.

Monoblocs 

An engine where all the cylinders share a common block is called a monobloc engine. Most modern engines use a monobloc design of some type, and few modern engines have a separate block for each cylinder. This has led to the term "engine block" usually implying a monobloc design, with "monobloc" itself rarely being used.

In the early years of the internal combustion engine, casting technology couldn't produce large castings with complex internal cores (for water jackets etc). Most early engines, particularly those with more than four cylinders, had their cylinders cast as pairs or triplets of cylinders, then bolted to a separate crankcase.

As casting techniques improved, an entire cylinder block of 4, 6, or 8 cylinders could be produced in one piece. This monobloc construction was simpler and more cost-effective to produce. For straight engine cylinder layouts, this meant that all the cylinders, plus the crankcase, could be produced in a single component. One of the early engines produced using this method is the 4-cylinder engine in the Ford Model T, introduced in 1908. The method spread to straight-six engines and was commonly used by the mid-1920s.

Up until the 1930s, most V engines retained a separate block casting for each cylinder bank, with both bolted onto a common crankcase (itself a separate casting). For economy, some engines were designed to use identical castings for each bank, left and right. A rare exception was the Lancia 22½° narrow-angle V12 of 1919, which used a single block casting combining both banks. The Ford flathead V8introduced in 1932represented a significant development in the production of affordable V engines. It was the first V8 engine with a single engine block casting, putting a V8 into an affordable car for the first time.

The communal water jacket of monobloc designs permitted closer spacing between cylinders. The monobloc design approach also improved the torsional rigidity of engines, as cylinder numbers, engine lengths, and power ratings increased.

Integrated cylinder block and crankcase 
Most engine blocks today, except some unusual V or radial engines and large marine engines, use a monobloc design with one block for all cylinders, plus an integrated crankcase. In such cases, the skirts of the cylinder banks form a crankcase area of sorts, which is still often called a crankcase despite no longer being a discrete part.

Use of steel cylinder liners and bearing shells minimizes the effect of the relative softness of aluminium. Some engine designs use plasma transferred wire arc thermal spraying, instead of cylinder sleeves, to further reduce weight. These types of engines can also be made of compacted graphite iron, such as in some diesel engines.

Integrated cylinder block and head 

Some modern consumer-grade small engines use a monobloc design where the cylinder head, block, and half of the crankcase share the same casting. One reason for this, apart from cost, is to produce an overall lower engine height. The primary disadvantage can be that repairs become more time-consuming and perhaps impractical.

An example of engines with integrated cylinder heads are the Honda GC-series and GXV-series engines, which are sometimes called "Uniblock" by Honda.

Integrated crankcase and transmission 
Several cars with transverse engines, have used an engine block consisting of an integrated transmission and crankcase. Cars that have used this arrangement include the 1966-1973 Lamborghini Miura and cars using the BMC A-series and E-series engines. This design often results in the engine and transmission sharing the same oil.

Motorcycles such as the Honda CB750 use a similar layout, with the cylinder block and crankcase integrated with part of the transmission.

Many farm tractor designs have the cylinder block, crankcase, transmission, and rear axle integrated into a single unit. An early example is the Fordson tractor.

See also
Core plug
Cylinder head
Head gasket
Automobile engine replacement § Short block
Automobile engine replacement § Long block

References

Automobile engines
Engine technology
Piston engine configurations